Lillian is an unincorporated community in eastern Baldwin County, Alabama, United States. Its eastern edge lies on the Alabama/Florida state line.

Demographics

History
The community was named for Lillian Kee, the daughter of William Thomas Kee, postmaster. In 1630, the King of Spain gave land grants to the Suarez family that included the current site of Lillian. The Baldwin Colonization Company purchased the area around Lillian in 1923 to promote the area as a resort location. Lillian was once home to a school and hotel. The hotel was originally located in Elberta then dismantled and moved to Lillian.

The Lillian post office was established in 1884.

The Perdido Bay Bridge, which spans Perdido Bay from Lillian to Florida, was first constructed in 1916. The bridge replaced a ferry that operated between Alabama and Florida. The original bridge was operated by the Perdido Bay Bridge and Ferry Company, but ownership was transferred to the states of Alabama and Florida when a second bridge was completed in 1930. The bridge was originally operated as a toll bridge, but tolls were discontinued in 1943. The current bridge was completed in 1980.

The Old Spanish Cemetery in Lillian includes burials from as early as the 16th century.

The Lillian Swamp is managed as a nature preserve as part of the Forever Wild Land Trust. The swamp is also listed as an Alabama Gulf Ecological Management Site due to its importance as an estuarine habitat and stopover for migratory birds.

References

Unincorporated communities in Baldwin County, Alabama
Unincorporated communities in Alabama
Populated places established in 1884
1884 establishments in Alabama